Sandra Cacic (born September 10, 1974) is a retired American tennis player. She is of Croatian American descent and

Her highest WTA singles ranking is 39th, which she achieved on May 9, 1994. Her career-high in doubles was world No. 87, reached in February 1999. In April 1998, she won the Amelia Island doubles tournament, partnering Mary Pierce. In singles, she won the Auckland Open in January 1996.

While playing, Cacic kept a residence in Bradenton, Florida.

WTA career finals

Singles: 1 (1 title)

Doubles: 1 (1 title)

ITF Circuit finals

Singles: 12 (8–4)

Doubles: 12 (4–8)

External links
 
 

American female tennis players
Sportspeople from Bradenton, Florida
Sportspeople from Joliet, Illinois
Tennis people from Florida
Tennis people from Illinois
1974 births
Living people
American people of Croatian descent
21st-century American women